Vărăncău (Voronkovo) is a commune in the Rîbnița District of Transnistria, Moldova, composed of three villages: Buschi (Буськи), Gherșunovca (Гершунівка) and Vărăncău.

The village Vărăncău is the site of the Church of the Blessed Virgin's Assumption, a Christian Orthodox church, construction of which was completed in 1800. Since then, the church has been open and functioning, standing much as it did when it first opened its doors.
It is the only church in Transnistria which was never closed during the Soviet times when all other churches had to close, holding therefore a special significance for the religious community in Transnistria.

Vărăncău also had a now abandoned military aerodrome of the former Soviet Union. The aerodrome was repeatedly struck by drones flying over the village on 6 May 2022. This was part of a series of attacks that happened in Transnistria as the 2022 Russian invasion of Ukraine was developing. These incidents may have been a false flag operation by Russia or Transnistria itself.

References

External links 
 "Voronkovo: Turning weapons into plowshares"

Communes of Transnistria
Rîbnița District